MoBlock is free software for blocking connections to and from a specified range of hosts. Moblock is an IP address filtering program for Linux that is similar to PeerGuardian for Microsoft Windows. Its development has been stopped in favor of Phoenix Labs' official PeerGuardian Linux and parts of its code have been merged in PeerGuardian Linux.

See also

 PeerGuardian
 iplist

External links
 MoBlock Homepage
 Debian packages for MoBlock and PeerGuardian Linux
 PeerGuardian project at sourceforge

Firewall software
Internet privacy software